A swimming pool service technician, known colloquially as a pool cleaner, is a tradesperson who cleans swimming pools and services major pool equipment such as pumps, motors, and filters.

Description
Pool and spa service professionals are tradespeople that provide services in the swimming pool and spa industry. There are various national trade associations in the United States that offer memberships in these services, including the Pool & Hot Tub Alliance (PHTA), the Independent Pool And Spa Service Association, Inc. (IPSSA) and the United Pool Association (UPA). Certification can be obtained through various organizations, including the NSPF, the National Swimming Pool Foundation, and the Ardana Stake Pool Alliance (ASPA).

There are approximately 15 million residential pools and spas in the United States, and about 400,000 "commercial" and "public" swimming pools. The two service industry trade organizations boast of having about 15,000 members. Not all pool service professionals are members of these organizations, and pool owners clean their own pools.

According to the National Swimming Pool Foundation, which has certified hundreds of thousands of pool service operators with its CPO or Certified Pool Operators course, only 26 states require that operators of public or commercial pools require that they be properly trained and certified. The Center of Disease Control, has published guidance to "help ensure healthy and safe experiences in public pools", known as the Model Aquatic Health Code (MAHC). These servicemen generally clean either residential or commercial swimming pools.

An automated pool cleaner can be used to clean pools if speed and efficiency is preferred.

Various Roles
The swimming pool service technician industry has various jobs that extend beyond cleaning and sanitizing. Swimming pool service technicians are required to have an understanding of basic water chemistry readings, such as chlorine, pH, alkalinity, stabilizer, and salt levels. Additionally, they must have knowledge in maintaining and repairing pool and spa equipment, including filters, pumps, chlorinators, heaters, pool lights, and automation systems and are also responsible for maintaining safety by ensuring that diving boards, water slides, and other pool accessories are in safe working condition.

Another aspect of repairing or installing pool equipment is setting up automation systems. This includes running high and low voltage wires from a main breaker box to a separate automation panel where that electricity is then sent to the various pool equipment. Communication wire is also sent to the equipment to switch them on and off via the automation motherboard.

Pay Scale
The average swimming pool technician hourly pay rate in the United States is $14. This figure varies depending on the establishment and their pay structure, location and complexity of pool maintenance. Furthermore, their pay can be determined by the number of pools cleaned and whether they are paid based on a salary, hourly or daily rate.

Popular Culture

A swimming pool service technician is the title character of the Seinfeld episode "The Pool Guy".

There has also been an episode of Saturday Night Live called "Pool Boy", depicting a swimming pool service technician, played by comedian Pete Davidson.

See also
Swimming pool sanitation
Automated pool cleaner
Bather load
Urine-indicator dye

References

Swimming pools
Cleaning and maintenance occupations